Kimberly Ann "Kim" Gallagher (June 11, 1964 – November 18, 2002) was an American middle-distance runner who won a silver and a bronze medal at the 1984 and 1988 Olympics.

Records

National high school records
800 Meters – 2:00.07
3200 Meter Relay – 8:58.43 (T. Pahutski, K. Baldwin, W. Crowell, K. Gallagher)

PIAA state records
800 meters – 2:05.47
1600 meters – 4:41.08
1600-meter relay – 3:49.61 (T. Pahutski, K. Baldwin, C. Woldecke, K. Gallagher)
3200-meter relay – 8:58.43 (T. Pahutski, K. Baldwin, W. Crowell, K. Gallagher)

Accomplishments
Gallagher was a High School All American at Upper Dublin High School, Penn Relays Champion, won twelve PIAA gold medals and was a Pennsylvania State Champion in Track & Field and cross-country. She was inducted into the Pennsylvania Track and Field Hall of Fame in 1995  and into the Penn Relays Hall of Fame in 1996.

In 2005, Gallagher was inducted into the Athletic Hall of Fame at Upper Dublin High School as part of the inaugural class.

Personal life
Gallagher took up athletics following her brother Bart, who coached her in her early years. In 1983, she abandoned her studies at the University of Arizona because they interfered with her training. She married John Corcoran of Oreland, Pennsylvania, where the couple made their home.

Death
After the 1988 Olympics, Gallagher was diagnosed with colon cancer. She refused chemotherapy and used vitamins, diet, and rest as a remedy, which initially appeared effective. But the cancer reemerged in 1994. In her last years, she used a wheelchair, and died from a stroke aged 38. She was survived by her mother Barbara, father John, husband John Corcoran, and 13-year-old daughter Jessica Smith.

References

1964 births
2002 deaths
Track and field athletes from Philadelphia
American female middle-distance runners
Olympic silver medalists for the United States in track and field
Olympic bronze medalists for the United States in track and field
Athletes (track and field) at the 1984 Summer Olympics
Athletes (track and field) at the 1988 Summer Olympics
Deaths from colorectal cancer
Medalists at the 1988 Summer Olympics
Medalists at the 1984 Summer Olympics
People from Upper Dublin Township, Pennsylvania
Sportspeople from Montgomery County, Pennsylvania
Deaths from cancer in Pennsylvania